Robert van Krieken is an Australian sociologist, Professor of Sociology at the University of Sydney.   He has also worked as Professor of Sociology at University College Dublin (2009-2011).   He is the author of Children and the State,  Norbert Elias,  Celebrity Society,  and co-author of the sociology textbook Sociology,  originally titled Sociology: Themes and Perspectives (Australian edition),  and Celebrity and the Law (with Patricia Loughlan and Barbara McDonald).  He has served in a variety of offices in the International Sociological Association, currently a Board Member of Working Group 02 Historical and Comparative Sociology.  In 2006-2010 he was a member of the Executive Committee, and at the XVII World Congress of Sociology in Gothenburg he was elected Vice-President (Finance and Membership) for 2010-2014.  He is also a member of The Australian Sociological Association.

His fields of research include the sociology of childhood, processes of civilization and decivilization, the formation of the self, sociological theory, especially that of Norbert Elias, celebrity, law and society, and cultural genocide.

Biography 

Robert Michael van Krieken (1955) was born of Dutch parents in Hong Kong, where he attended primary school. From secondary school onwards he has lived in Sydney, Australia. He studied sociology as part of a Bachelor of Arts degree at the University of New South Wales, where he also did his PhD, which he completed in 1977. He started working at the University of Sydney in 1979, teaching Social Theory in the Department of Social Work. In the 1990s he played a central role in the development of a sociology programme at the University of Sydney, which since 2001 it has been the core of a distinct Department of Sociology & Social Policy. He went on to complete a Law degree at the University of Sydney, gaining his LLB in 2003, which formed the foundation for the development of a programme in socio-legal studies, now also part of the Department of Sociology & Social Policy.

He is currently on the editorial board of Contemporary Sociology,  and he has also served on the editorial boards of Law & Social Inquiry and Childhood.

Publications

Books 
  Celebrity Society (Routledge, 2012) [ISBN 978-0415581509]
  Celebrity and the Law [with Patricia Loughlan & Babara McDonald] (Sydney: Federation Press, 2010) [ISBN 978-1862877382]
  Sociology (4th edition) [[with P. Smith, D. Habibis, B. Hutchins, G. Martin, K. Maton] (Sydney: Pearson, 2010) [ISBN 978-0733993862]
  Norbert Elias] (London: Routledge, 1998). [ISBN 978-0415104166] 
  Children and the State: Social Control and the Formation of Australian Child Welfare (Sydney: Allen & Unwin) [ISBN 978-1863730952]

Selected articles 
 ‘Kumarangk (Hindmarsh Island) and the politics of natural justice under settler-colonialism’, Law & Social Inquiry 26(1) 2011: 125-49.
 ‘Cultural Genocide’, in The Historiography of Genocide, edited by Dan Stone, London: Palgrave Macmillan, 2008: 128-155.
 ‘The ethics of corporate legal personality’, in Management Ethics: Contemporary Contexts, edited by Stewart Clegg & Carl Rhodes, London: Routledge, 2006: 77-96.
 ‘Law’s autonomy in action: anthropology and history in court’, Social & Legal Studies 15(4) 2006: 577-93.
 ‘The “best interests of the child” and parental separation: on the “civilizing of parents”’, Modern Law Review 68(1) 2005: 25-48.
 ‘The paradox of the ‘two sociologies’’: Hobbes, Latour and the constitution of modern social theory’, Journal of Sociology 38(3) 2002: 255-73
 ‘From Milirrpum to Mabo: the High Court, Terra Nullius and Moral Entrepreneurship’, UNSW Law Journal 23(1) 2000: 63-77.
 ‘The barbarism of civilization: cultural genocide and the ‘stolen generations’’, British J of Sociology 50(2) 1999: 295-313.
 ‘Sociology and the reproductive self: demographic transitions and modernity’ Sociology 31(3) 1997: 445-71.
 ‘The organisation of the soul: Elias and Foucault on discipline and the self’ Archives Europeénes de Sociologie 31(2) 1990: 353-71.
 ‘Violence, self-discipline and modernity: beyond the “civilizing process”’ Sociological Review 37(2) 1989: 193-218.
 ‘Social theory and child welfare: beyond social control’ Theory & Society 15(3) 1986: 401-29.

External links 

 Homepage at the University of Sydney
 Personal Homepage*
 ISA Journeys through Sociology Interview

References 

1955 births
Living people
Australian sociologists
Academic staff of the University of Sydney
University of New South Wales alumni